WUSJ (96.3 FM, "US96.3") is a country radio station licensed to Madison, Mississippi, and serving greater Jackson. The station is owned by Meridian, Mississippi-based Digio Strategies, and licensed to New South Radio, Inc. It airs a country music format.  Its studios are located in Ridgeland and the transmitter site is in Raymond.

History
The station first signed on the air on September 16, 1966, as WSLI-FM. The station changed its call letters to WJFR in 1976, with a talk radio format. For a short time from 1982 until 1983, the station became WXLY-FM, running a country format. Retaining the format, the station changed its call letters to WYYN during the year. Its format lasted until 1987 when it dropped country for adult contemporary as "Class-FM". The station also began simulcasting WSLI. In 1990, its call letters changed to WJDX retaining the AC format, and for a short time in 1998, its call letters changed to WKXS. After 12 years in 1999, it permanently returned to a country format, switching their calls to WUSJ on July 13, 1999.

References

External links
WUSJ official website
The Radio People

Country radio stations in the United States
Madison County, Mississippi
USJ
The Radio People radio stations